The Errand Boy is a 1961 American comedy film directed by, co-written by and starring Jerry Lewis.

Plot
Paramutual Pictures decide that they need a spy to find out the inner workings of their studio.  Morty S. Tashman, (the 'S' stands for 'scared'), is a paperhanger who happens to be working right outside their window.  They decide that he is the man for the job and hire him on the spot.  He bumbles his way through a series of misadventures, reporting everything back to the corporate executives.

The Paramutual Studio President eventually has to fire Morty for incompetency. But secret film taken of his bumbling becomes public and everybody wants to know who the terrific new comedy star is. Paramutual is forced to beg Morty to come back and rescue the studio from bankruptcy; which he does.

Cast
Jerry Lewis as Morty S. Tashman
Brian Donlevy as Tom "T.P." Paramutual
Howard McNear as Dexter Sneak
Dick Wesson as The A. D.
Robert Ivers as Young NY director who argues with T.P.
Pat Dahl as Miss Carson
Renée Taylor as Miss Giles
Rita Hayes as Singer who dubs Davitt
Stanley Adams as Grumpy
Kathleen Freeman as Mrs. Helen Paramutual/Mrs. T.P.
Isobel Elsom as Irma Paramutual
Sig Ruman as Baron Elston Carteblanche
Felicia Atkins as Serina
Doodles Weaver as Weaver
Fritz Feld as Roaring 20's Director
Richard Bakalyan as The Studio Director
Kenneth MacDonald as Mr.Fumble
Herb Vigran as man with cigar in elevator
Barry Livingston as boy who wants jellybeans
Milton Frome as Mr. Greenback
Benny Rubin as Mr. Wabenlotnee
Paul Frees as Unseen Narrator(uncredited)

Cast notes
The cast of the western TV series Bonanza makes a cameo appearance.
Leo Durocher (baseball manager and player) gives a group of "studio kids" (actually the Dover Basketeers) a pep talk.
Joe Besser, a former member of the Three Stooges, has a bit part.

Production
The Errand Boy was filmed from July 24 to September 1, 1961 and was released on November 28, 1961 by Paramount Pictures.

Release
In 1967, it was re-released on a double bill with another Jerry Lewis film, Cinderfella.

Reception
On Rotten Tomatoes, the film holds a 50% rating based on 10 reviews, with an average rating of 5.47/10.

Home media
The film was released on DVD on October 12, 2004, July 15, 2014 in a 4-film collection, 4 Film Favorites: Jerry Lewis, with The Bellboy, The Ladies Man, and The Patsy, and March 15, 2021.

References

External links

1961 films
1961 comedy films
1960s English-language films
Films about filmmaking
Films directed by Jerry Lewis
Films scored by Walter Scharf
Paramount Pictures films
Films with screenplays by Jerry Lewis
Films with screenplays by Bill Richmond (writer)
American comedy films
1960s American films
English-language comedy films